This is a list of notable people from Gloucester County, New Brunswick. Although not everyone in this list was born in Gloucester County, they all live or have lived in Gloucester County and have had significant connections to the communities.

This article does not include People from Bathurst as they have their own wiki page.

Members of the House of Assembly of New Brunswick
The House of Assembly of New Brunswick was, between 1784 and 1968, founded on a representative democracy based on a county system. This list, from MacMillan (reference below), is of Members elected in Gloucester County, New Brunswick, which was originated in 1827 on the partition of Northumberland County, New Brunswick. Cabinet members seem to be indicated in MacMillan's list by the prenominal Honourable.

Other people from Gloucester County

See also
 List of people from New Brunswick

References

Bibliography

Gloucester